What's Wrong with This Picture? is the debut studio album by the Australian Idol third season third-place finisher, Lee Harding.The album was released in February 2006 and peaked at number 3 on the ARIA Charts.

Track listing
"Wasabi" – 3:00
"Let's Not Go to Work" – 2:59
"Anything for You" – 3:02
"Just Another Love Song" – 4:01
"L Is for Loser" – 3:30
"Call the Nurse" – 3:43
"You Could Have Anyone" – 2:35
"Change the World" – 3:41
"Try Tonight" – 2:55
"Eye of the Tiger" – 2:45

Enhanced CD
"Wasabi" (Video)
Inside Wasabi (Behind the Scenes of the Video)
Inside Anything for You (Behind the Scenes of the Video)

Charts

Weekly charts

Year-end charts

Certifications

Release history

References

2006 debut albums
Lee Harding albums
Sony Music Australia albums